"Fast (Motion)" is a song recorded by American rapper Saweetie. The song was released on May 7, 2021, via Icy and Warner Records. It serves as the fourth single from Saweetie's debut studio album, Pretty Bitch Music.

Background and release 
The release of "Fast (Motion)" comes after a slew of songs, including Saweetie's own "Best Friend", which features Doja Cat. This was followed by the release of a remix for Gwen Stefani's "Slow Clap". Saweetie later released the extended play, Pretty Summer Playlist: Season 1. "Fast (Motion)" was released on May 7, 2021, via Icy and Warner Records. It serves as the fourth single for her upcoming debut album, Pretty Bitch Music following "Tap In", "Back to the Streets" and "Best Friend".

Composition 
"Fast (Motion)" is a "kinetic dance-rap track" which Tom Breihan of Stereogum called "rubbery" and "energetic". The song was produced by The Monarch and was inspired by Miami dance culture.

Music video 
The music video for "Fast (Motion)" was directed by James Larese. Makeup is handled by Deanna Paley, who worked with Saweetie previously. In the video, Saweetie performs in multiple sporting activities, including soccer, American football, track and field, boxing, as well as skydiving and basketball. The video features a cameo from WNBA player A'ja Wilson.

Charts

References 

2021 singles
2021 songs
Saweetie songs